Armando Menocal (July 8, 1863 in Havana – September 28, 1942 in Havana) was a Cuban painter.

Biography and career
He first studied at the Academy of San Alejandro in his native city, before going to Spain in 1880 for further study with Francisco Jover y Casanova; there he also became acquainted with the work of Joaquín Sorolla and the thinking of Marcelino Menéndez y Pelayo.  He also exhibited in Spain, winning numerous awards.  Menocal later returned to Cuba to join the Liberation Forces in the Cuban War of Independence; upon its completion, he dedicated himself to the teaching of art, returning to his alma mater as a professor of landscape painting.  In 1927 he was named director; in 1940 he became director emeritus.  His paintings decorated many public buildings around Havana, and today may be seen in the Museo Nacional de Bellas Artes de La Habana.  He was also a member of Cuba's National Academy of Arts and Letters.  He died in 1942.

References

Biography at Cernuda Arte

1863 births
1942 deaths
People from Havana
19th-century Cuban painters
19th-century male artists
20th-century Cuban painters
20th-century Cuban male artists
Male painters